Babak Larian, MD, FACS is the director of the Center for Advanced Head & Neck Surgery in Beverly Hills, Los Angeles. He is also the director of the Head and Neck Cancer Center at Cedars-Sinai. He is also involved at the Cedars-Sinai Thyroid Cancer Center and the Cedars-Sinai Sinus Center. Currently he also serves as the assistant clinical professor of surgery at the David Geffen School of Medicine. Larian is the current medical director of the HELPS International Medical Mission. As a medical author, he has served as a member of the editorial review panel for several peer-reviewed journals. He is the managing partner of the LaPeer Surgery Center, a medical organization specializing in various fields including Plastic & Reconstructive Surgery.

Academic career

Larian did his medical education at the University of California, Irvine School of Medicine, University of California. He did his surgical training at the Ronald Reagan UCLA Medical Center. He received the Merk Manual Award in 1996. He specializes in the treatment of all head and neck cancers, including complex advanced tumors, skull base tumors and recurrent cancers.

Larian has been featured in various media outlets and magazines such as PSP (Plastic Surgery Practice), the Globe Health Report, and the Health Radar.

Professional affiliations

Larian is professionally affiliated to the following institutes and organizations:

 Board Certified, 2003, American Academy of Otolaryngology–Head and Neck Surgery.
 Fellow, 2007, American Head & Neck Society.
 Fellow, 2006, American College of Surgeons.
 California Medical Association
 Los Angeles Society of Otolaryngology–Head and Neck Surgery
 Alpha Omega Alpha Honor Medical Society
 Phi Beta Kappa Society

Humanitarian causes

Larian is actively involved in Medical Missions for Children, an independent, non-profit organization that works to improve health outcomes of the world's critically ill children. He is also involved in other charity ventures such as the Global Smile Foundation, Helps International and Los Angeles Free Clinic.

Recognition

In 2011, Larian was named by U.S. News & World Report as one of the Top Doctors in the field of ENT. He has also won accolades for his medical research, including those in the field of micro parotidectomy, minimally invasive thyroidectomy, and balloon sinuplasty. He has served as a member of the editorial review panel for several peer-reviewed journals, the most prominent being Archives of Otolaryngology–Head & Neck Surgery, Journal of Cranio-Maxillofacial Trauma, Otolaryngology–Head and Neck Surgery, Archives of Facial Plastic Surgery and Head and Neck Surgery.

Publications

References

External links
 CENTER for Advanced Head & Neck Surgery
 CENTER for Advanced Parotid Surgery
 CENTER for Advanced Parathyroid Surgery

American otolaryngologists
Living people
University of California, Irvine alumni
Physicians from California
Year of birth missing (living people)